Allophylus zeylanicus ( - wal kobbe) is a species of plant in the family Sapindaceae. It is endemic to Sri Lanka.

Description 
The appearance of the Allophylus zeylanicus is usually of a small shrub or treelet. The leaves are oval in shape with points at the end, with entire margins. The bark is a whitish color, the young shots are covered in small hairs. The flowers are red, ovoid, smooth. The whole plant is used in medicinal purposes.

Habitat and ecology
This plant species can be found in lowland areas, wetlands, and evergreen forests. The Allophylus zeylanicus is part of a terrestrial system.
The Allophylus zeylanicus will occur within and up to 2000m of the montane zone.

References

Endemic flora of Sri Lanka
zeylanicus
Vulnerable plants
Plants described in 1753
Taxa named by Carl Linnaeus
Taxonomy articles created by Polbot